is a passenger railway station located in the city of Shikokuchūō, Ehime Prefecture, Japan. It is operated by JR Shikoku and has the station number "Y24".

Lines
Iyo-Sangawa Station is served by the JR Shikoku Yosan Line and is located 81.7 km from the beginning of the line at Takamatsu. Yosan line local, Rapid Sunport, and Nanpū Relay services stop at the station.

Layout
The station consists of two side platforms serving two tracks. The station building is unstaffed and serves as a waiting room. Access to platform 2 is by means of a footbridge.

Sidings branch off the tracks on both sides of the station.

Adjacent stations

History
The station opened on 1 April 1933 as a new station on the existing Yosan Line. At that time the station was operated by Japanese Government Railways, later becoming Japanese National Railways (JNR). With the privatization of JNR on 1 April 1987, control of the station passed to JR Shikoku.

Scenes from the 2010 movie Shodo Girls were filmed at this station.

Surrounding area
 Japan National Route 11
Samukawa Toyooka Seaside Park
Shikokuchuo Municipal Mishima Minami Junior High School

See also
 List of railway stations in Japan

References

External links
Station timetable

Railway stations in Ehime Prefecture
Railway stations in Japan opened in 1933
Shikokuchūō